CYP2U1 (cytochrome P450, family 2, subfamily U, polypeptide 1) is a protein that in humans is encoded by the CYP2U1 gene

Function 

This gene encodes a member of the cytochrome P450 superfamily of enzymes. The cytochrome P450 proteins are monooxygenases which catalyze many reactions involved in drug metabolism and synthesis of cholesterol, steroids and the hydroxylation of fatty acids and fatty acid metabolites. CYP2U1 metabolized arachidonic acid, docosahexaenoic acid (DHA), and other long chain fatty acids which suggests that CYP2U1 may play a role in brain and immune functions. CYP2U1 also metabolizes propanone, acetone, and 2-oxypropane.

Tissue distribution 

The CYP2U1 gene is a highly conserved gene that is mainly expressed in brain and thymus, but also at lower levels in kidney, lung, and heart.

Reactions 

CYP2U1 hydroxylates arachidonic acid, docosahexaenoic acid (DHA), and other long chain fatty acids at their terminal (i.e., ω) carbon to form 20-hydroxy-arachidonic acid (i.e. 20-Hydroxyeicosatetraenoic acid or 20-HETE), 22-hydroxy-docosahexaneoic acid, and other ω-hydroxy long chain fatty acids, respectively, plus lesser amounts of these fatty acids ω-1 hydroxy metabolites, i.e. 19-HETE, 21-hydroxy-docosahexaenoic acid, and other ω-1 hydroxy long chain fatty acids, respectively.  One of these metabolites, 20-HETE, is a regulator of blood pressure and blood flow to organs in animal models and, based on genetic studies, possibly in humans (see 20-Hydroxyeicosatetraenoic acid).

Clinical significance 

A mutation (c.947A>T) in CYP2U1 has been associated in a very small number of patients with hereditary spastic paraplegia in that it segregates with the disease at the homozygous state in two afflicted families.  This mutation affects an amino acid (p.Asp316Val) that is highly conserved among CYP2U1 orthologs as well as other cytochrome P450 proteins; this p.Asp314Val mutation is located in the enzyme's functional domain, is predicted to be damaging to the enzyme's activity, and is associated with mitochondria dysfunction.  A second homozygous enzyme-disabling mutation has been identified in CYP2U1, c.1A>C/p.Met1?, that is associated with <1% of hereditary spastic paraplegia sufferers.  The reduction in 20-HETE production by these mutations, and thereby in 20-HETE's activation of the TRPV1 neural receptor, it is hypothesized, may contribute to the development of this disease (see 20-Hydroxyeicosatetraenoic acid for details).

CYPU21 along with members of the CYP4A and CYP4F sub-families also ω-hydroxylate and thereby reduce the activity of various fatty acid metabolites of arachidonic acid including LTB4, 5-HETE, 5-oxo-eicosatetraenoic acid, 12-HETE, and several prostaglandins that are involved in regulating various inflammatory, vascular, and other responses in animals and humans. This hydroxylation-induced inactivation may underlie the proposed roles of the cytochromes in dampening inflammatory responses and the reported associations of certain CYP4F2 and CYP4F3 single nucleotide variants with human Krohn's disease and Coeliac disease, respectively.

References

External links

Further reading